In Search of Angels is a 1999 album, the tenth by Scottish Celtic rock band Runrig.
This is the first Runrig album without longtime lead vocalist Donnie Munro, introducing his replacement Bruce Guthro.

Track listing
 "Maymorning" - 5:44
 "The Message" - 5:19
 "Rìbhinn Donn" (Brown Haired Girl) - 3:58
 "Big Sky" - 6:34
 "Life Is  - 4:01
 "Dà Mhìle Bliadhna" (Two Thousand Years) - 4:40
 "This Is Not a Love Song" - 5:25
 "A Dh'innse na Fìrinn" (To Tell You the Truth) - 4:47
 "All Things Must Change" - 4:15
 "Cho Buidhe Is A Bha I Riabh" (As Yellow As It Ever Was) - 4:02
 "Travellers" - 2:59
 "In Search of Angels" - 3:32

Personnel
Runrig
Iain Bayne - drums, percussion
Bruce Guthro - lead vocals
Malcolm Jones - guitars, accordion
Calum Macdonald - percussion
Rory Macdonald - vocals, bass guitar
Peter Wishart - keyboards

Runrig albums
1999 albums
Scottish Gaelic music